Chathupama Gunasinghe (born 5 May 1987) is a Sri Lankan cricketer. He made his first-class debut for Sinhalese Sports Club in the 2007–08 Premier Trophy on 27 March 2008.

References

External links
 

1987 births
Living people
Sri Lankan cricketers
Galle Cricket Club cricketers
Sinhalese Sports Club cricketers
Sportspeople from Galle